The WTA Tour is the elite tour for professional women's tennis organised by the Women's Tennis Association (WTA). The WTA Tour includes the four Grand Slam tournaments, the WTA Tour Championships and the WTA Tier I, Tier II, Tier III and Tier IV events. ITF tournaments are not part of the WTA Tour, although they award points for the WTA World Ranking.

Schedule 
This is the complete schedule of events on the 1999 WTA Tour. Player progression is documented from the quarterfinals stage.

Key

January

February

March

April

May

June

July

August

September

October

November

Rankings 
The Race to the Championships determines the players in the WTA Tour Championships in November. The WTA rankings are based on tournaments of the latest 52 weeks.

Singles 
The following is the 1999 top 25 ranked players in the world.

Number 1 ranking

Doubles 
The following are the 1999 top 20 individual ranked doubles players.

Number 1 ranking

See also 
 1999 ATP Tour
 List of female tennis players
 List of tennis tournaments

References

External links 
 Women's Tennis Association (WTA) official website

 
WTA Tour
WTA Tour seasons